Khedi Khurd is a village in the Khargone district of Madhya Pradesh, India. It is located in the Gogawaa tehsil.

Demographics 

According to the 2011 census of India, Kolu Khedi Khurd has 192 households. The effective literacy rate (i.e. the literacy rate of population excluding children aged 6 and below) is 51.34%.

References 

Villages in Berasia tehsil